Samoylovsky is a rural locality (a settlement) in Kozlovsky Selsoviet of Volodarsky District, Astrakhan Oblast, Russia. The population was 153 as of 2010. There are 2 streets.

Geography 
Samoylovsky is located 34 km northeast of Volodarsky (the district's administrative centre) by road. Baklanye is the nearest rural locality.

References 

Rural localities in Volodarsky District, Astrakhan Oblast